East Nashville Historic District is a historic neighborhood in East Nashville, Tennessee. It was listed on the National Register of Historic Places listings in Davidson County, Tennessee (NRHP) in 1982.

History
The district is 2 miles east of downtown Nashville. The area was developed between the late 19th and early 20th centuries. Historically, it has been a middle class area. There are 352 buildings in the district and the majority of the buildings are single family homes. The district also has several churches a corner store and a school. There are 22 blocks: geographically the land is rolling terrain. The borders of the district are: to the north, East Land Avenue, in the south Fatherland Street, in the east South 16 and South 14 Streets, and in the west Gallatin Road.

Architecture
Buildings in the district: late Victorian, Neoclassical, Bungalow and modern houses. There are Victorian buildings and also modest houses. Other architectural styles include: Beaux-Arts architecture, Stick architecture, Eastlake architecture and Queen Anne style architecture.

NRHP
The District was added to the National Register of Historic Places listings in Davidson County, Tennessee on April 15, 1982.

References

National Register of Historic Places in Nashville, Tennessee
Historic districts on the National Register of Historic Places in Tennessee
Neighborhoods in Nashville, Tennessee
Populated places in Davidson County, Tennessee